Two ships of the United States Navy have borne the name Big Horn, after the Bighorn River. 

 , was a tanker acquired by the Navy in 1942, and converted into a Q-ship. She was struck in 1946.
 , is a Henry J. Kaiser-class fleet replenishment oiler in service since 1992

See also

United States Navy ship names